Jorge Leal Amado de Faria (10 August 1912 – 6 August 2001) was a Brazilian writer of the modernist school. He remains the best known of modern Brazilian writers, with his work having been translated into some 49 languages and popularized in film, including Dona Flor and Her Two Husbands in 1976.  His work reflects the image of a Mestiço Brazil and is marked by religious syncretism. He depicted a cheerful and optimistic country that was beset, at the same time, with deep social and economic differences.

He occupied the 23rd chair of the Brazilian Academy of Letters from 1961 until his death in 2001. He won the 1984 International Nonino Prize in Italy. He also was Federal Deputy for São Paulo as a member of the Brazilian Communist Party between 1947 and 1951.

Biography
Amado was born on Saturday, 10 August 1912, on a farm near the inland city of Itabuna, in the south of the Brazilian state of Bahia. He was the eldest of four sons of João Amado de Faria and D. Eulália Leal.  The farm was located in the village of Ferradas, which, though today is a district of Itabuna, was at the time administered by the coastal city of Ilhéus. For this reason he considered himself a citizen of Ilhéus. From his exposure to the large cocoa plantations of the area, Amado knew the misery and the struggles of the people working the land and living in almost enslaved conditions. This was to be a theme present in several of his works (for example, The Violent Land of 1944).

As a result of a smallpox epidemic, his family moved to Ilhéus when he was one year old, and he spent his childhood there. He attended high school in Salvador, the capital of the state. By the age of 14 Amado had begun to collaborate with several magazines and took part in literary life, as one of the founders of the Modernist "Rebels' Academy".

He was the cousin of Brazilian lawyer, writer, journalist and politician Gilberto Amado, and of Brazilian actress and screenwriter Véra Clouzot.

Amado published his first novel, The Country of Carnival, in 1931, at age 18. He married Matilde Garcia Rosa and had a daughter, Lila, in 1933. The same year he published his second novel, Cacau, which increased his popularity. 

He studied law at the Federal University of Rio de Janeiro Faculty of Law but never became a practising lawyer. His leftist activities made his life difficult under the dictatorial regime of Getúlio Vargas. In 1935 he was arrested for the first time, and two years later his books were publicly burned. His works were banned from Portugal, but in the rest of Europe he gained great popularity with the publication of Jubiabá in France. The book received enthusiastic reviews, including that of Nobel prize Award winner Albert Camus.

In the early 1940s, Amado edited a literary supplement for the Nazi-funded political newspaper "Meio-Dia". Being a communist militant, from 1941 to 1942 Amado was compelled to go into exile to Argentina and Uruguay. When he returned to Brazil he separated from Matilde Garcia Rosa. In 1945 he was elected to the National Constituent Assembly, as a representative of the Brazilian Communist Party (PCB) (he received more votes than any other candidate in the state of São Paulo). He signed a law granting freedom of religious faith.

He remarried in 1945, to the writer Zélia Gattai. In 1947 they had a son, João Jorge. The same year his party was declared illegal, and its members arrested and persecuted. Amado chose exile once again, this time in France, where he remained until he was expelled in 1950. 

His daughter from his first marriage, Lila, died in 1949. From 1950 to 1952 Amado and Gattai lived in Czechoslovakia, where another daughter, Paloma, was born. He also travelled to the Soviet Union, winning the Stalin Peace Prize in 1951. Recently released documents show that in this period he was investigated by the CIA.

On his return to Brazil in 1954, Amado abandoned active political life, leaving the Communist Party one year later. From that period on he dedicated himself solely to literature. 

His second creative phase began in 1958 with Gabriela, Clove and Cinnamon, which was described by Jean-Paul Sartre as "the best example of a folk novel". Amado abandoned, in part, the realism and the social themes of his early works, producing a series of novels focusing mainly on feminine characters, devoted to a kind of smiling celebration of the traditions and the beauties of Bahia. In addition to Gabriela these novels included Tereza Batista: Home from the Wars and Dona Flor and Her Two Husbands. 

His depiction of the sexual customs of his land was scandalous to much of 1950s Brazilian society and for several years Amado could not even enter Ilhéus, where Gabriela was set, due to threats received for the alleged offense to the morality of the city's women. The Soviet Union kept publishing Amado's works shortly after their release in Portuguese.

On 6 April 1961, he was elected to the Brazilian Academy of Letters. On his death his wife was elected to replace him. Amado made the Academy the setting for one of his novels, Pen, Sword, Camisole. He received the title of Doctor honoris causa from several universities in Brazil, Portugal, Italy, Israel and France, as well as other honors in almost every South American country, including Obá de Xangô (santoon) of the Candomblé, the traditional Afro-Brazilian religion of Bahia. 

He was finally removed from the French Government blacklist in 1965 following the intervention of the then Minister of Culture, André Malraux. In 1984 he was awarded the French Légion d’Honneur by President François Mitterrand.

His books have been translated into 49 languages in 55 countries, and adapted into films, theatrical works and TV programs. They even inspired some samba schools of the Brazilian Carnival.

In 1987, the House of Jorge Amado Foundation was created in Salvador. It promotes the protection of Amado's estate and the development of culture in Bahia. The recently renovated building on the Pelourinho in Salvador contains a small museum and wall panels with the covers of international editions of his books.

Amado died on Monday, 6 August 2001, at 7:30 PM (22:30 GMT). His ashes were spread in the garden of his house four days later.

In 4 December 2014 he received (posthumously) from the Legislative Assembly of Bahia appointment as Commander of Meritorious Citizen of the Freedom and Social Justice João Mangabeira (CBJM), due to his work in defense of social rights, the State's highest honor.

Works

Selected works include:
 The Country of Carnival (O País do Carnaval, 1931)
 Cacau (1933)
 Sweat (Suor, 1934)
 Jubiabá (1935)
 Sea of Death (Mar Morto, 1936)
 Captains of the Sands (Capitães da Areia, 1937)
 The ABC of Castro Alves (ABC de Castro Alves, 1941)
 The Knight of Hope (Vida de Luis Carlos Prestes or O Cavaleiro da Esperança, 1942)
 The Violent Land (Terras do Sem Fim, 1943)
 The Golden Harvest (São Jorge dos Ilhéus, 1944)
 Bahia de Todos-os-santos (1945)
 Red Field (Seara Vermelha, 1946)
 The Bowels of Liberty trilogy (Os Subterrâneos da Liberdade, 1954)
 Gabriela, Clove and Cinnamon (Gabriela, Cravo e Canela, 1958)
 The Double Death of Quincas Water-Bray (A Morte e a Morte de Quincas Berro D'agua, 1959)
 Home Is the Sailor (Os Velhos Marinheiros ou o Capitão de Longo Curso, 1961)
 Ogum's Compadre (O compadre de Ogum, 1964)
 Shepherds of the Night (Os Pastores da Noite, 1964)
 Dona Flor and Her Two Husbands (Dona Flor e Seus Dois Maridos, 1966)
 Tent of Miracles (Tenda dos Milagres, 1969)
 Tereza Batista: Home from the Wars (Teresa Batista Cansada da Guerra, 1972)
 The Swallow and the Tomcat: A Love Story (O Gato Malhado e a Andorinha Sinhá: uma história de amor, 1976)
 Tieta (Tieta do Agreste, 1977)
 Pen, Sword, Camisole (Farda Fardão Camisola de Dormir, 1979)
 Showdown (Tocaia Grande, 1984)
 The War of the Saints (O Sumiço da Santa, 1988)
 Coasting (Navegação de Cabotagem, 1992)
 The Discovery of America by the Turks (A Descoberta da América pelos Turcos'', 1994)

References

External links

  Jorge Amado's Biography
 Jorge Amado's Ilhéus
 Extensive Info and New Editions
 
Jorge Amado recorded at the Library of Congress for the Hispanic Division's audio literary archive on 8 August 1977.

1912 births
2001 deaths
Brazilian socialists
Brazilian communists
20th-century Brazilian dramatists and playwrights
Brazilian male dramatists and playwrights
Brazilian people of Portuguese descent
Members of the Brazilian Academy of Letters
People from Ilhéus
Stalin Peace Prize recipients
Brazilian Communist writers
Modernist writers
20th-century Brazilian novelists
Brazilian male novelists
Brazilian science fiction writers
Camões Prize winners
Brazilian expatriates in Czechoslovakia
20th-century Brazilian male writers
Brazilian memoirists
Brazilian Communist Party politicians
Members of the Chamber of Deputies (Brazil) from São Paulo
20th-century memoirists